The Surrey Stars were an English women's Twenty20 cricket team based in South London that competed in the English women's Twenty20 competition, the Women's Cricket Super League. The Stars played their home matches at The Oval and Woodbridge Road, Guildford. They were captained by Nat Sciver and coached by Richard Bedbrook, working with Surrey’s Director of Women’s Cricket Ebony Rainford-Brent. The Stars won the 2018 Women's Cricket Super League, beating Loughborough Lightning in the final at the County Cricket Ground, Hove. In 2020, following reforms to the structure of women's domestic cricket, some elements of the Surrey Stars were retained for a new team, the South East Stars.

History

2016–2019: Women's Cricket Super League

Surrey Stars were formed in 2016 to compete in the new Women's Cricket Super League, partnering with Surrey CCC. In their inaugural season, they finished 4th in the group stage, just missing out on Finals Day, winning two matches. In 2017, the Stars improved, winning four of their five games to finish second in the group and progress to the semi-final. However, here they were beaten by eventual tournament winners Western Storm, by 3 wickets. Stars all-rounder Nat Sciver was the leading wicket-taker in the tournament, with 12 wickets.

In 2018, Surrey Stars finished 3rd in the group stage, with 5 wins, qualifying for the semi-final where they again faced Western Storm. This time, the Stars were victorious, winning by 9 runs thanks to a Player of the Match performance from Nat Sciver, who scored 72* and took two wickets. In the final, the Stars faced Loughborough Lightning. Batting first, the Stars posted 183, with overseas player Lizelle Lee hitting 104. Loughborough then collapsed to 117 all out, giving Surrey Stars their first WCSL title.

2019 saw a reversal in Surrey's fortunes, as they finished 5th out of 6 in the group stage, with 3 wins. This was the final season of Surrey Stars' existence, as women's cricket in England was reformed in 2020; the South East Stars retained some elements of Surrey Stars, but represent a larger region under the new structure.

Home grounds

Players
Final squad, 2019 season
 No. denotes the player's squad number, as worn on the back of their shirt.
  denotes players with international caps.

Overseas players
  Rene Farrell – Australia (2016–2017)
  Marizanne Kapp – South Africa (2016–2019)
  Lea Tahuhu – New Zealand (2016)
  Lizelle Lee – South Africa (2017–2019)
  Dane van Niekerk – South Africa (2018–2019)

Seasons

Women's Cricket Super League

Statistics

Overall Results

 Abandoned matches are counted as NR (no result)
 Win or loss by super over or boundary count are counted as tied.

Teamwise Result summary

Records
Highest team total: 183/6, v Loughborough Lightning on 27 August, 2018.
Lowest team total: 66, v Yorkshire Diamonds on 12 August, 2018.
Highest individual score: 104, Lizelle Lee v Loughborough Lightning on 27 August, 2018.
Best individual bowling analysis: 5/26, Rene Farrell v Lancashire Thunder on 16 August, 2017.
Most runs: 930 in 31 matches, Nat Sciver.
Most wickets: 32 wickets in 31 matches, Nat Sciver.

Honours
 Women's Cricket Super League:
 Champions (1) – 2018

See also
Surrey County Cricket Club
Surrey Women cricket team

References

Surrey Stars
Women's Cricket Super League teams
2016 establishments in England
Cricket in London
Cricket in Surrey
Cricket clubs established in 2016
Surrey County Cricket Club